Plum Grove can refer to:
United States
 Plum Grove, Kansas, a ghost town
 Plum Grove, Mississippi, an unincorporated community
 Plum Grove, Texas, a city
 Plum Grove Historic House in Iowa City, Iowa
 Plum Grove, Illinois, now known as Rolling Meadows, Illinois
 Plum Grove Junior High School, a junior high school in Rolling Meadows, Illinois.